A vector operator is a differential operator used in vector calculus.  Vector operators are defined in terms of del, and include the gradient, divergence, and curl:

The Laplacian is

Vector operators must always come right before the scalar field or vector field on which they operate, in order to produce a result. E.g.

yields the gradient of f, but

is just another vector operator, which is not operating on anything.

A vector operator can operate on another vector operator, to produce a compound vector operator, as seen above in the case of the Laplacian.

See also
 del
 d'Alembertian operator

Further reading
 H. M. Schey (1996) Div, Grad, Curl, and All That: An Informal Text on Vector Calculus, .

Vector calculus